Sports Management Worldwide (SMWW) is an international sports agency and private for-profit sports management training institution based in Portland, Oregon. It is an accredited online Sports Management school and is certified by the Oregon Department of Education. SMWW offers online sports career training courses, and both graduate and undergraduate programs. Sports Management Worldwide is a member of the North American Society for Sport Management.

The training institution offers over 35 sports management courses and has 20,000 graduates from over 162 countries.

SMWW and "Sports Agent" course graduates co-represent professional athletes throughout the world, including:

NFL: Matt Moore of the Kansas City Chiefs, Kyle Sloter of the Chicago Bears, and Akeem Jordan of Philadelphia Eagles.

NBA: Alfonzo McKinnie of the LA Lakers and Rodney Stuckey of the Detroit Pistons.

Notable Faculty: 

 Aaron Schatz
 Ari Kaplan
 Dan Evans
 Harry Sinden
 Joel Corry
John Wooten
 Ken Jacobs
Lynn Lashbrook
 Marc Trestman
 Mark Dominik
 Mark Warkentien
 Mick Hogan
 Sky Andrew
 Tommy Smyth

References 

Companies based in Portland, Oregon
Education in Portland, Oregon
For-profit universities and colleges in the United States
Privately held companies based in Oregon
2002 establishments in Oregon